Andrew James Smart (born 17 March 1986) is an English footballer who last played for Ramsbottom United. He has previously played for Macclesfield Town in the Football League.

Career

Macclesfield Town 
Born in Wythenshawe, Manchester, Smart came from the youth system at Macclesfield Town and in 2005 he made it into the first team squad. He stayed there for two-years making only nine appearances and not scoring. In 2007, he went out on loan to Northwich Victoria making 18 appearances scoring 1 goal. He was released on his return to Macclesfield.

Stalybridge Celtic 
After his release from Macclesfield Town he joined Conference North side Stalybridge Celtic and he stayed there for two-years where he was more of a first team regular making almost 100 league appearances for them before his move to Hyde.

Hyde 
On 2 July 2010, Smart completed his move to Hyde. He made his debut on 17 July 2010, in a 2–0 pre-season defeat to Manchester City Reserves. He scored his first goal for Hyde on 21 August 2010, in a 5–1 defeat to Alfreton Town. He made it two Hyde goals four days later when he converted penalty in the 3–1 defeat to local rivals Droylsden. In April 2011, he was awarded with the Jack Harrop trophy for leading scorer, after he finished as Hyde's top goalscorer for the 2010–11 season.

He left Hyde during the summer of 2011 as part of a mass clear out at the club. He joined Trafford.FC, before signing for Altrincham in March 2012. He rejoined Trafford for the start of the 2012–2013 season.

In the summer of 2014 he moved to Salford City. He made his club debut in the opening league match of the season on 16 August as Salford beat Scarborough Athletic 4–1. In September 2014 he rejoined Trafford.

He joined Ramsbottom United in 2016 from Glossop North End.

References

External links

1986 births
Living people
People from Wythenshawe
English footballers
Association football midfielders
Macclesfield Town F.C. players
Northwich Victoria F.C. players
Stalybridge Celtic F.C. players
Hyde United F.C. players
Trafford F.C. players
Altrincham F.C. players
Salford City F.C. players
Glossop North End A.F.C. players
Ramsbottom United F.C. players